Morrell station or Morrell Avenue station is a DART Light Rail station located in Dallas, Texas. It is located at Morrell and Woodbine Avenues in the Oak Cliff neighborhood. This is the first station outbound after the Blue Line diverges from the Red Line.

References

External links 
 DART - Morrell Station

Dallas Area Rapid Transit light rail stations in Dallas
Railway stations in the United States opened in 1996
1996 establishments in Texas
Railway stations in Dallas County, Texas